John Dahlsen is an Australian contemporary environmental artist. He uses found objects, primarily ocean litter plastics, from Australian beaches in his work.

Biography
Dahlsen studied art from 1977 to 1979 at the Victorian College of the Arts and in 1989 at the Melbourne College of Advanced Education. He completed his PhD at Charles Darwin University in 2016. In addition to his art, he also lectures at Australian universities and at environmental symposiums around the world. He has exhibited work in many solo and group exhibitions since 1979. Dahlsen currently lives in Byron Bay, New South Wales, Australia.

Awards
In 2000, Dahlsen won the Wynne Prize from the Art Gallery of New South Wales for his piece Thong Totems. He was also a finalist in both 2003 and 2004. In 2006 he was a finalist for the Sir John Sulman Medal from the Art Gallery of New South Wales and the second prize winner of the Signature of Sydney Art Prize. He has also won many other awards, such as the 2003 award for mixed media/new media at the Florence Biennial of Contemporary Art, Environmental Art Awards at the Swell Sculpture Exhibition in 2009 and 2010, and the Peoples Choice Award in the ArtsCape Biennial Sculpture Exhibition in 2010.

He has also been awarded several grants from the Australian government as well as private groups.

See also
Art of Australia

References

External links
John Dahlsen's official website

Environmental artists
Living people
Victorian College of the Arts alumni
University of Melbourne alumni
Australian installation artists
Wynne Prize winners
1963 births